Paulo Roese (born 14 February 1963) is a Brazilian volleyball player. He competed in the men's tournament at the 1988 Summer Olympics.

References

External links
 

1963 births
Living people
Brazilian men's volleyball players
Olympic volleyball players of Brazil
Volleyball players at the 1988 Summer Olympics
People from Novo Hamburgo
Sportspeople from Rio Grande do Sul